Sir Percy Burrell, 4th Baronet DL, JP (10 February 1812 – 19 July 1876) was a British Conservative politician.

Background
Born at Grosvenor Place, London, he was the second son of Sir Charles Burrell, 3rd Baronet and his wife Frances Wyndham, an illegitimate daughter of George Wyndham, 3rd Earl of Egremont. Burrell was educated at Westminster School and Christ Church, Oxford, where he matriculated in 1830. He served in the British Army and was captain of the 18th Sussex Rifle Volunteers.

Career
In 1862, he succeeded his father as baronet. He entered the British House of Commons in the same year, sitting for New Shoreham, the constituency his father had also represented before, until his death in 1876. He was a Deputy Lieutenant and Justice of the Peace of Sussex.

Family
On 26 August 1856, he married Henrietta Katherine Brooke-Pechell, daughter of Vice-Admiral Sir George Brooke-Pechell, 4th Baronet at St George's, Hanover Square in London. Their marriage was childless. Burrell died, aged 64, at Belgrave Square in London. He was succeeded in the baronetcy by his younger brother Walter.

References

External links

1812 births
1876 deaths
Alumni of Christ Church, Oxford
Baronets in the Baronetage of Great Britain
Percy
Conservative Party (UK) MPs for English constituencies
Deputy Lieutenants of Sussex
UK MPs 1859–1865
UK MPs 1865–1868
UK MPs 1868–1874
UK MPs 1874–1880